This is a list of members of the United States Congress who enslaved people. Slavery was legal in the United States from its beginning as a nation, having been practiced in North America from early colonial days.

Synopsis
At least 1,700 members of Congress held slaves at some point in their lives, including 374 senators, at least 1,477 representatives, at least 23 territorial delegates to the U.S. House, at least 6 members of the Congress of the Confederation, and at least 2 members of the Continental Congress.

Slaveowners, whether holding slaves in office or previously as adults, represented 37 states in either house of Congress, from 1789 to 1923:

 Alabama
 Arkansas
 California
 Connecticut
 Delaware
 Florida
 Georgia
 Illinois
 Indiana
 Iowa
 Kentucky
 Louisiana
 Maine
 Maryland
 Massachusetts
 Michigan
 Mississippi
 Missouri
 New Hampshire
 New Jersey
 New York
 North Carolina
 Ohio
 Oregon
 Pennsylvania
 Rhode Island
 South Carolina
 Tennessee
 Texas
 Virginia
 West Virginia
 Wisconsin

In addition, the following territories and insular areas were represented by contemporary or former slaveowners who were elected as delegates:

 Arkansas Territory
 Florida Territory
 Illinois Territory
 Indiana Territory
 Louisiana Territory
 Michigan Territory
 Mississippi Territory
 Missouri Territory
 New Mexico Territory
 Northwest Territory
 Oregon Territory
 Utah Territory
 Washington Territory
 Wisconsin Territory

Numerous slaveowners, contemporary and former, served in the Continental Congress and the Congress of the Confederation, and slaveowning men constituted at least half of the membership of Congress from 1789 to 1819. The Thirteenth Amendment to the United States Constitution formally abolished slavery in 1865, immediately after the end of the American Civil War. During Reconstruction, the number of former slaveowners declined, but then rose following the end of Reconstruction, followed by a gradual decline in the number of former slaveowners.

William Richardson of Alabama was the last of the continuous line of former slaveholders to serve in Congress, having died in office in 1914. The 64th Congress of 1915-1917 was the first full session to not have any contemporary or former slaveholders in its roster. The last slaveholder to ever hold office in Congress was Rebecca Latimer Felton, who was appointed to represent Georgia in the United States Senate for one day during the 67th Congress. In addition to being the first woman to serve in the Senate, she was the only female slaveowner to ever hold office in Congress.

On January 10, 2022, The Washington Post launched the first known database of documented contemporary or former slaveowners who held office in Congress and its preceding legislatures.

Senate

House

Representatives

Delegates

Other national legislators

References 

Lists of members of the United States Congress